Offshore concrete structures have been in use successfully for about 50 years. They serve the same purpose as their steel counterparts in the oil and gas production and storage. The first concrete oil platform has been installed in the North Sea in the Ekofisk field in 1973 by Phillips Petroleum. Since then 47 major concrete offshore structures have been built.

Introduction 
Concrete offshore structures are mostly used in the petroleum industry as drilling, extraction or storage units for crude oil or natural gas. Those large structures house machinery and equipment needed to drill and/or extract oil and gas. But concrete structures are not only limited to applications within the oil and gas industry. Several conceptual studies have shown recently, that concrete support structures for offshore wind turbines are very competitive compared to common steel structures, especially for larger water depths.

Depending on the circumstances, platforms may be attached to the ocean floor, consist of an artificial island, or be floating. Generally, offshore concrete structures are classified into fixed and floating structures. Fixed structures are mostly built as concrete gravity based structures (CGS, also termed as caisson type), where the loads bear down directly on the uppermost layers as soil pressure. The caisson provides buoyancy during construction and towing and acts also as a foundation structure in the operation phase. Furthermore, the caisson could be used as storage volume for oil or other liquids.

Floating units may be held in position by anchored wires or chains in a spread mooring pattern. Because of the low stiffness in those systems, the natural frequency is low and the structure can move in all six degrees of freedom. Floating units serve as productions units, storage and offloading units (FSO) or for crude oil or as terminals for liquefied natural gas (LNG). A more recent development is concrete sub-sea structures.

Concrete offshore structures show an excellent performance. They are highly durable, constructed of almost maintenance-free material, suitable for harsh and/or arctic environment (like ice and seismic regions), can carry heavy topsides, often offer storage capacities, are suitable for soft grounds and are very economical for water depths larger than 150m. Most gravity-type platforms need no additional fixing because of their large foundation dimensions and extremely high weight.

Fixed structures 
Since the 1970s, several fixed concrete platform designs have been developed. Most of the designs have in common a base caisson (normally for storage of oil) and shafts penetrating the water surface to carry the topside. In the shafts normally utility systems for offloading, drilling, draw down and ballast are put up.

Concrete offshore platforms of the gravity-base type are almost always constructed in their vertical attitude. This allows the inshore installation of deck girders and equipment and the later transport of the whole structure to the installation site.

The most common concrete designs are:
 Condeep (with one, two, three or four columns)
 ANDOC (with four columns)
 Sea Tank (with two or four columns)
 C G Doris
 Arup Concrete Gravity Substructure (CGS)

Condeep Type 
Condeep refers to a make of gravity base structure for oil platforms invented by Olav Mo and fabricated by Norwegian Contractors in Norway. Condeep usually consists of a base of concrete oil storage tanks from which one, three or four concrete shafts rise. The original Condeep always rests on the sea floor, and the shafts rise to about 30m above the sea level. The platform deck itself is not a part of the construction.
The Condeep Platforms Brent B (1975) and Brent D (1976) were designed for a water depth of 142m in the Brent oilfield operated by Shell. Their main mass is represented by the storage tank (ca. 100m diameter and 56m high, consisting of 19 cylindrical compartments with 20m diameter). Three of the cells are extended into shafts tapering off at the surface and carrying a steel deck. The tanks serve as storage of crude oil in the operation phase. During the installation these tanks have been used as ballast compartment.
Among the largest Condeep type platform are the Troll A platform and the Gullfaks C. Troll A was built within four years and deployed in 1995 to produce gas from the Troll oil field which was  developed by Norske Shell, since 1996 operated by Statoil.
A detailed overview about Condeep platforms is given in a separate article.

Concrete Gravity Base Structures (CGBS) is a further development of the first-generation Condeep drilling/production platforms installed in the North Sea between the late 1970s and mid '90s. The CGBS have no oil storage facilities and the topside installations will be carried out in the field by a float-over mating method. Current or most recent projects are:
 Sakhalin-II platforms (Piltun-Astokhskoye B (PA-B) platform and Lunskoye (LUN-A) platform)

C G DORIS Type 

The first concrete gravity platform in the North Sea was a C G Doris platform, the Ekofisk Tank, in Norwegian waters.
The structure has a shape not unlike a marine sea island and is surrounded by a perforated breakwater wall (Jarlan patent).
The original proposal of the French group C G DORIS (Compagnie General pour les Developments Operationelles des Richesses Sous-Marines) for a prestressed post-tensioned concrete "island" structure was adopted on cost and operational grounds. DORIS was general contractor responsible for the structural design: the concrete design was prepared and supervised on behalf of DORIS by Europe-Etudes. Further example for the C G DORIS designs are the Frigg platforms, the Ninian Central Platform and the Schwedeneck platforms.
The design typically consists of a large volume caisson based on the sea floor merging into a monolithic structure, which is offering the base for the deck. The single main leg is surrounded by an outer breaker wall perforated with so called Jarlan holes. This wall is intended to break up waves, thus reducing their forces.

McAlpine/Sea Tank 

This design is quite similar to the Condeep type.

ANDOC Type 
To achieve its goal and extract oil within five years after discovering the Brent reservoir Shell
divided up the construction of four offshore platforms. Redpath Dorman Long at Methil in Fife, Scotland getting Brent A, the two concrete Condeeps B and D were to be built in Norway by Norwegian Contractors (NC) of Stavanger, and C (also concrete) was to be built by McAlpine at Ardyne Point on the Clyde (which is known as the ANDOC (Anglo Dutch Offshore Concrete) design). The ANDOC design can be considered as the British construction industry's attempt to compete with Norway in this sector. McAlpine constructed three concrete platforms for the North Sea oil industry at Ardyne Point. The ANDOC type is very similar to the Sea Tank design, but the four concrete legs terminate and steel legs take over to support the deck.

Arup Concrete Gravity Substructure (CGS) 

The Arup dry-build Concrete Gravity Substructure (CGS) concept was originally developed by Arup in 1989 for Hamilton Brothers' Ravenspurn North. The Arup CGS are designed to be simple to install, and are fully removable. Simplicity and repetition of concrete structural elements, low reinforcement and pre-stress densities as well as the use of normal density concrete lead to economical construction costs. Typical for the Arup CGS is the inclined installation technique. This technique helps to maximise economy and provide a robust offshore emplacement methodology. Further projects have been the Malampaya project in the Philippines and the Wandoo Full Field Development on the North West Shelf of Western Australia.

Floating structures 
Since concrete is quite resistant to corrosion from salt water and keeps maintenance costs low, floating concrete structures have become increasingly attractive to the oil and gas industry in the last two decades. Temporary floating structures such as the Condeep platforms float during construction but are towed out and finally ballasted until they sit on the sea floor. Permanent floating concrete structures have various uses including the discovery of oil and gas deposits, in oil and gas production, as storage and offloading units and in heavy lifting systems.

Common designs for floating concrete structures are the barge or ship design, the platform design (semi-submersible, TLP) as well as the floating terminals e.g. for LNG.

Floating production, storage, and offloading systems (FPSOS) receive crude oil from deep-water wells and store it in their hull tanks until the crude is transferred into tank ships or transport barges. In addition to FPSO’s, there have been a number of ship-shaped Floating Storage and Offloading (FSO) systems (vessels with no production processing equipment) used in these same areas to support oil and gas developments. An FSO is typically used as a storage unit in remote locations far from pipelines or other infrastructures.

Semi-Submersible 
Semi-submersible marine structures are typically only movable by towing. Semi-submersible platforms have the principal characteristic of remaining in a substantially stable position, presenting small movements when they experience environmental forces such as the wind, waves and currents. Semi-Submersible platforms have pontoons and columns, typically two parallel spaced apart pontoons with buoyant columns upstanding from those pontoons to support a deck. Some of the semi-submersible vessels only have a single caisson, or column, usually denoted as a buoy while others utilize three or more columns extended upwardly from buoyant pontoons. For activities which require a stable offshore platform, the vessel is then ballasted down so that the pontoons are submerged, and only the buoyant columns pierce the water surface - thus giving the vessel a substantial buoyancy with a small water-plane area. The only concrete semi-submersible in existence is Troll B.

Tension Leg Platform (TLP) 
A Tension Leg Platform is a buoyant platform, which is held in place by a mooring system. TLP mooring is different to conventional chained or wire mooring systems. The platform is held in place with large steel tendons fastened to the sea floor. Those tendons are held in tension by the buoyancy of the hull. Statoil's Heidrun TLP is the only one with a concrete hull, all other TLPs have steel hulls.

Barge/Ship Design 
FPSO or FSO systems are typically barge/ship-shaped and store crude oil in tanks located in the hull of the vessel. Their turret structures are designed to anchor the vessel, allow “weathervaning” of the units to accommodate environmental conditions, permit the constant flow of oil and production fluids from vessel to undersea field, all while being a structure capable of quick disconnect in the event of emergency.

The first barge of prestressed concrete has been designed in the early 1970s as an LPG (liquefied petroleum gas) storage barge in the Ardjuna Field (Indonesia). This barge is built of reinforced and prestressed concrete containing cylindrical tanks each having a cross-section perpendicular to its longitudinal axes that comprises a preferably circular curved portion corresponding to the bottom.

Major offshore concrete structures 

Following table summarizes the major existing offshore concrete structures.

References

Printed literature

External links
 Structurae [en]: Troll A Platform (1995)
 The sinking of the Sleipner A offshore platform
 About the Hibernia Platform
 Adriatic LNG Terminal
 Sakhalin Energy
 Malampaya.com

Oil platforms
Structural engineering